Grooveline Horns is an American funk and R&B-based horn section, originating in Austin, Texas.  They are best known for touring and recording with Maroon 5, Kelly Clarkson, Jason Mraz, and Zac Brown Band.

Band members

Current members

 Carlos Sosa - saxophones
 Fernando “Fernie” Castillo - trumpet
 Raul “Ralo” Vallejo - trombone

Past members
 Reggie Watkins - trombone
 Paul Armstrong - trumpet
 Serafin Aguilar - trumpet
 Bret Harrell - trombone

Discography

Awards

|-
| style="text-align:center;" | 2009
| We Sing. We Dance. We Steal Things., Jason Mraz
| 2009 Teen Choice Awards
|  
|-
| style="text-align:center;" | 2005
| Best Groupera Album, La Mafia
| Latin Grammy Awards
|  
|-
| style="text-align:center;" | 2004
| Spanish Album of the Year, Con Poder, Salvador
| 35th GMA Dove Awards
|
|-
| style="text-align:center;" | 1997
| Best Horns: Grooveline Horns, The Scabs
| Austin Music Awards
| 
|-
| style="text-align:center;" | 1998
| Best Horns: Grooveline Horns
| Austin Music Awards
| 
|-
| style="text-align:center;" | 1999
| Best Horns: Grooveline Horns
| Austin Music Awards
| 
|-
| style="text-align:center;" | 2000
| Best Horns: Grooveline Horns, The Scabs
| Austin Music Awards
| 
|-
| style="text-align:center;" | 2001
| Best Horns: Grooveline Horns
| Austin Music Awards
| 
|-
| style="text-align:center;" | 2003
| Best Horns: Grooveline Horns
| Austin Music Awards
| 
|-
| style="text-align:center;" | 2006
| Best Horns: Grooveline Horns
| Austin Music Awards
| 
|-

Tours

Live guest performances

Television and video appearances

References

External links
Facebook

Musical groups from Austin, Texas
Brass musicians
Horn players
American funk musical groups
American soul musical groups
American instrumental musical groups
American Latin musical groups
Musical backing groups